Raider is a children's novel by Susan Gates, published in 1995. It was shortlisted for the Carnegie Medal and the Guardian Children's Fiction Award.

The novel is about Flora and Maddy's investigation of the mystery surrounding the death of a boy who fell into the sea from the Arctic Raider, a deep-sea trawler, many years before.

Footnotes

1995 British novels
British children's novels
Children's mystery novels
1995 children's books
Oxford University Press books